The 1995 Maui Invitational Tournament was an early-season college basketball tournament that was played, for the 12th time, from November 20 to November 22, 1995. The tournament, which began in 1984, was part of the 1995-96 NCAA Division I men's basketball season.  The tournament was played at the Lahaina Civic Center in Maui, Hawaiiand was won by the Villanova Wildcats. It was the first title for both the program and for its head coach Steve Lappas.

Bracket

References

Maui Invitational Tournament
Maui Invitational